Hathkadi is a 1958 Bollywood film starring Motilal and Shakila. The movie is directed by Sudarshan Bhatia and music is directed by Naushad Ali. The movie was released on 1 January 1958.

Music
"Piya Jab Se Liya Tune Hatho Me Hath" - Mohammed Rafi, Lata Mangeshkar
"Dunia Hai Badi Zalim" - Asha Bhosle, Mohammed Rafi
"Chori Chori Aana Aadhi Rat Re Sajanwa" - Sudha Malhotra, Usha Mangeshkar
"Gira Ke Chal Diye" - Asha Bhosle
"Mai Jau Kaha Lut Gaya Mera Jaha" - Asha Bhosle
"Sun Dil Ki Dhadkane O Mere Raja" - Shamshad Begum, Khan Mastana

References

External links
 

1950s Hindi-language films
1958 films